The Beauty of Hindsight is the thirteenth studio album by the British singer Judie Tzuke. Released in 2003, it is the first covers album of Tzuke's career and features songs previously recorded by The Beatles, Crowded House, Smokey Robinson, Jackson Browne, Neil Young, and Elton John (who had signed Tzuke to his record company Rocket Records in the 1970s).

Track listing
 "Tracks of My Tears" (William "Smokey" Robinson, Jr., Warren Moore, Marvin Tarplin)
 "May You Never" (John Martyn)
 "Hey Jude" (Paul McCartney, John Lennon)
 "Head and Heart" (John Martyn)
 "Goodbye" (Elton John)
 "Fall At Your Feet" (Neil Finn)
 "Know These Things Shouldn't You" (Maxwell)
 "I Can See Everything" (originally by Poco, written by Timothy B. Schmit)
 "We Are Not Helpless" (Stephen Stills)
 "Hard To Love" (Kayah and Goran Bregović)
 "Want You More" (Robert Palmer)
 "Lives in the Balance" (Jackson Browne)
 "Birds" (Neil Young)
 "You Send Me" (Sam Cooke)

References
 Official website

Judie Tzuke albums
2003 albums